LGH may refer to:

 Lahore General Hospital, Pakistan
 Lakeshore General Hospital, Quebec, Canada 
 Landesgymnasium für Hochbegabte, school in Schwäbisch Gmünd, Germany
 Leibgarde der Hartschier, life guard of the Kingdom of Bavaria
 Leicester General Hospital, England
 Lions Gate Hospital, North Vancouver, British Columbia, Canada
 Lowell General Hospital, Massachusetts, US
 Leigh Creek Airport in South Australia (IATA code)